The men's bantamweight event was part of the boxing programme at the 1992 Summer Olympics. The weight class allowed boxers of up to 54 kilograms to compete. The competition was held from 28 July to 8 August 1992. 31 boxers from 31 nations competed.

Medalists

Results
The following boxers took part in the event:

First round
 Ahmed Aboud (IRQ) – BYE
 Wayne McCullough (IRL) def. Fred Mutuweta (UGA), 28:7
 Chatree Suwanyod (THA) def. Vladislav Antonov (EUN), 6:4
 Mohammed Sabo (NGR) def. Robert Ciba (POL), RSC-3 (02:27)
 Serafim Todorov (BUL) def. John Sem (PNG), 11:0
 Joseph Chongo (ZAM) def. Magno Ruben Ruiz (GUA), 7:3
 Lee Gwang-Sik (PRK) def. László Bognár (HUN), AB-3 (01:00)
 Sergio Reyes Jr. (USA) def. Harold Ramírez (PUR), 10:1
 Riadh Klai (TUN) def. Miguel Dias (NED), 17:1
 Joel Casamayor (CUB) def. Devarajan Venkatesan (IND), 13:7
 Roberto Jalnaiz (PHI) def. Agustín Castillo (DOM), RSCH-1 (02:46)
 Philippe Wartelle (FRA) def. Jesús Pérez (COL), 12:5
 Javier Calderón (MEX) def. Benjamin Ngaruiya (KEN), 16:4
 Remigio Molina (ARG) def. Oscar Vega (ESP), 14:4
 Mohammed Achik (MAR) def. Dieter Berg (GER), 3:0
 Slimane Zengli (ALG) def. Zhang Guangping (CHN), 4:0

Second round
 Wayne McCullough (IRL) def. Ahmed Aboud (IRQ), 10:2
 Mohammed Sabo (NGR) def. Chatree Suwanyod (THA), 16:7
 Serafim Todorov (BUL) def. Joseph Chongo (ZAM), 18:6
 Lee Gwang-Sik (PRK) def. Sergio Reyes Jr. (USA), 15:8
 Joel Casamayor (CUB) def. Riadh Klai (TUN), 16:11
 Roberto Jalnaiz (PHI) def. Philippe Wartelle (FRA), RSCI-2 (00:32)
 Remigio Molina (ARG) def. Javier Calderón (MEX), 5:4
 Mohammed Achik (MAR) def. Slimane Zengli (ALG), 12:8

Quarterfinals
 Wayne McCullough (IRL) def. Mohammed Sabo (NGR), 31:13
 Lee Gwang-Sik (PRK) def. Serafim Todorov (BUL), 16:15
 Joel Casamayor (CUB) def. Roberto Jalnaiz (PHI), KO-1 (02:01)
 Mohammed Achik (MAR) def. Remigio Molina (ARG), 15:5

Semifinals
 Wayne McCullough (IRL) def. Lee Gwang-Sik (PRK), 21:16
 Joel Casamayor (CUB) def. Mohammed Achik (MAR), AB-1 (02:33)

Final
 Joel Casamayor (CUB) def. Wayne McCullough (IRL), 16:8

References

Bantamweight